Steve Kelly (born October 26, 1976) is a Canadian former professional ice hockey center who played in the National Hockey League (NHL) with the Edmonton Oilers, Tampa Bay Lightning, New Jersey Devils, Los Angeles Kings and the Minnesota Wild.

Playing career
Kelly played his junior hockey with the Prince Albert Raiders of the Western Hockey League (WHL), where he compiled 254 points in 268 games. In 1995–96, Kelly tallied 101 points and 203 penalty minutes to lead the Raiders to a 47-win season and second place in the WHL Eastern Division. Kelly was then drafted in the first round, sixth overall, of the 1995 NHL Entry Draft by the Edmonton Oilers.

Despite his high draft status, Kelly has never appeared in more than 43 games in an NHL season and has just 21 points in 147 games. Kelly played just 27 games for the Edmonton Oilers during the 1996–97 and 1997–98 seasons before being traded in February 1998 to the Tampa Bay Lightning along with Bryan Marchment and Jason Bonsignore in exchange for Roman Hamrlík and Paul Comrie.

After 58 games over two seasons with the Lightning, Kelly was sent to the New Jersey Devils prior to the 1999–2000 season, where he spent the majority of the season with their American Hockey League (AHL) affiliate, the Albany River Rats. Kelly notched 57 points for Albany, but made just one appearance with the Devils. However, injuries during the Devils' playoff run forced Kelly into the NHL lineup, where he appeared in 10 games during the Devils' Stanley Cup-winning drive. In February 2001, after 25 games in New Jersey, Kelly was traded to the Los Angeles Kings for forward Bob Corkum. With L.A.'s AHL affiliate, the Manchester Monarchs, Kelly enjoyed his best statistical seasons as a pro, amassing 133 points in just 113 games from 2002–2004, and represented the Canadian All-Stars in the 2004 AHL All-Star Classic.

Following the 2003–04 season, Kelly signed in Germany's Deutsche Eishockey Liga (DEL) with Adler Mannheim. In November 2005, Kelly signed with the Frankfurt Lions of the same league, where he scored 20 points in 22 games. In 2007, he signed with the Minnesota Wild and spent much of the season with the team's AHL affiliate, the Houston Aeros, before being called up at the end of the season to fill in at center. After being signed by the Columbus Blue Jackets and sent down to their affiliate the Syracuse Crunch, Kelly chose to return to Europe by signing a one-year contract with HDD Olimpija Ljubljana in Erste Bank Eishockey Liga. However, after posting 3 points in only his second game in the 2009–10 season, Kelly suffered a season-ending injury and decided to terminate his contract and retire from professional hockey in order to return to Canada.

While showing promise at the beginning of his pro career, Kelly is often regarded as a draft bust during his NHL career. Many fans and media expected the Oilers to draft Shane Doan (an obvious choice who was drafted next by Winnipeg, and later become the captain of the Jets/Coyotes franchise), or Jarome Iginla (an Edmonton native and junior teammate of Doan's), but Edmonton drafted Kelly sixth overall instead.

Personal life
After retiring, Kelly joined the Calgary Police Service as a police officer.

Career statistics

References

External links 

 Picture of Steve Kelly's Name on the 2000 Stanley Cup Plaque

1976 births
Living people
Adler Mannheim players
Albany River Rats players
Canadian expatriate ice hockey players in Slovenia
Canadian expatriate ice hockey players in Germany
Canadian ice hockey centres
Cleveland Lumberjacks players
Detroit Vipers players
Edmonton Oilers draft picks
Edmonton Oilers players
Frankfurt Lions players
Hamilton Bulldogs (AHL) players
HDD Olimpija Ljubljana players
Houston Aeros (1994–2013) players
Ice hockey people from Vancouver
Los Angeles Kings players
Manchester Monarchs (AHL) players
Milwaukee Admirals (IHL) players
Minnesota Wild players
National Hockey League first-round draft picks
New Jersey Devils players
Prince Albert Raiders players
Stanley Cup champions
Syracuse Crunch players
Tampa Bay Lightning players